Miles "Cap" Ferry (September 22, 1932 – March 31, 2017) is an American former politician who was a Republican member of the Utah House of Representatives and Utah State Senate. He attended Utah State University, earning a Bachelor of Science degree. Ferry was a farmer and rancher, managing the J.Y. Ferry & Son ranch. He won an Outstanding Young Farmer award in 1958 and was the FFA Honorary State Farmer in 1975. In the state senate, he was Minority Whip from 1975 to 1976, Minority Leader from 1977 to 1978, and President of the Senate from 1979 to 1984. Ferry resigned his senate seat in 1984 to accept an appointment to the position of the State Commissioner of Agriculture, a position he held from 1985 to 1993.

References

1932 births
2017 deaths
Republican Party members of the Utah House of Representatives
Republican Party Utah state senators